Evercreech New, originally called "Evercreech Village", was a railway station at Evercreech on the Somerset and Dorset Joint Railway.

The station opened in 1874 with the completion of the extension of the S&D from the nearby Evercreech Junction to Bath. It closed in March 1966 when the line was shut as part of the Beeching axe.

References

External links
 https://web.archive.org/web/20070518103104/http://www.sdjr.net/locations/evercreech_new.html
 Station on navigable O.S. map

Disused railway stations in Somerset
Former Somerset and Dorset Joint Railway stations
Railway stations in Great Britain opened in 1874
Railway stations in Great Britain closed in 1966
Beeching closures in England
Mendip District